Giuseppe Tommaso Giovanni Giordani (December 19, 1751, Naples – January 4, 1798, Fermo) was an Italian composer, mainly of opera.

Giordani's parents were Domenico Giordani and Anna Maria Tosato. He studied music in Naples with Domenico Cimarosa and Niccolò Antonio Zingarelli. In 1774 he was appointed as music director of the chapel of the Duomo of Naples. His first opera (L'Epponina) was released in 1779. His sacred drama La distruzione di Gerusalemme was a notable success at the Teatro San Carlo of Naples in 1787. He became maestro di cappella at the Cathedral of Fermo in 1791.

Until recently, the popular aria Caro Mio Ben (1783) was ascribed to Giuseppe Tommaso Giovanni Giordani. However, scholars now consider Tommaso Giordani, or his father Giuseppe Giordani senior, more likely to be the aria's composer.

References

External links
 
 

1751 births
1798 deaths
Musicians from Naples
Italian male classical composers
Italian opera composers
Male opera composers
Italian Classical-period composers
18th-century Italian composers
18th-century Italian male musicians